Outside the Dream Syndicate is a 1973 album by United States avant-garde composer Tony Conrad in collaboration with German krautrock group Faust. The album marks Conrad's first and only musical release for many years, and remains his best known musical work. It is considered a classic of minimalist and drone music. Pitchfork exclaims "for a moment in Outside the Dream Syndicate, one forgets what exactly is moving and what is standing still."

The original LP contained two 26-minute pieces. The album was digitally remastered in 1993 and released on CD by Table of the Elements with an additional 20-minute previously unreleased bonus track.

Background
In the mid-1960s Tony Conrad was a member of The Dream Syndicate, a United States experimental and drone music group.

In New York City Conrad was approached by a filmmaker from Hamburg in Germany who said that he knew a producer in Hamburg who would be interested in Conrad's music. Conrad flew to Hamburg where he met Uwe Nettelbeck, Faust's producer. Nettelbeck took Conrad to an old schoolhouse where Faust had been recording, and invited him to make a record with the band, "outside" Conrad's group, the Dream Syndicate (and hence the title of the album).

In 1995, Conrad and Faust reunited to play a 50-minute live version of the piece "From the Side of Man and Womankind"; the concert was eventually released in 2005 as the album Outside the Dream Syndicate Alive.

In 2015, they collaborated for the last time, for a live performance at the famous Berlin Atonal festival, which marked the last public appearance of Conrad before his death in April 2016.

Track listing
All tracks written by Tony Conrad.

1973 LP release
Side A
"From the Side of Man and Womankind" – 27:16
Side B
"From the Side of the Machine" – 26:20

1993 CD release
"From the Side of Man and Womankind" – 27:16
"From the Side of the Machine" – 26:20
"From the Side of Woman and Mankind" – 20:04

2002 30th Anniversary edition (2 CD)
CD 1
"From the Side of Man and Womankind" – 27:16
"From the Side of the Machine" – 26:20
CD 2
"The Pyre of Angus Was in Kathmandu" – 03:38
"The Death of the Composer Was in 1962" – 03:16
"From the Side of Woman and Mankind (complete version)" – 31:09

Personnel
Tony Conrad – violin
Werner "Zappi" Diermaier – drums
Jean-Hervé Péron – bass guitar
Rudolf Sosna – guitar and keyboards
Kurt Graupner – engineer
Uwe Nettelbeck – producer

References

External links
Outside the Dream Syndicate. The Faust pages.

1973 albums
Faust (band) albums
Caroline Records albums
Collaborative albums
Albums produced by Uwe Nettelbeck